The Syndicalist Popular Party (PPS) was a political party in Brazil founded in 1945 by Miguel Reale. The PPS merged with other parties to form the Social Progressive Party (PPS) in 1946.

In the 1945 election, the PPS elected four deputies and one Senator - Olavo de Oliveira in Ceará.

Political history of Brazil
Defunct political parties in Brazil
Political parties established in 1945
Political parties disestablished in 1946
1945 establishments in Brazil
1946 disestablishments in Brazil